Swedish Hospital is a hospital in Chicago. Swedish Hospital may also refer to:

Health care in Sweden
Swedish Health Services, formerly Swedish Medical Center, a healthcare network in the metropolitan Seattle area
Swedish Medical Center (Colorado), a hospital in Englewood, Colorado

See also
List of hospitals in Sweden